The 1998 Atlantic 10 Men's Basketball Tournament was played from March 4 to March 7, 1998. The tournament was played at The Spectrum in Philadelphia, Pennsylvania.  The winner was named champion of the Atlantic 10 Conference and received an automatic bid to the 1998 NCAA Men's Division I Basketball Tournament. Xavier University won the tournament. Massachusetts, Rhode Island, Temple, and George Washington also received bids to the NCAA Tournament. James Posey of Xavier was named the tournament's Most Outstanding Player. Including Posey, 4 of the 5 players on the All-Championship Team were from Xavier.  Joining Posey were Torraye Braggs, Lenny Brown and Darnell Williams of Xavier, and Shawnta Rogers of George Washington. Posey and Braggs would eventually play in the NBA, while Rogers would also play professionally.  The top two teams in each division received a first-round bye.

Bracket

All games played at The Spectrum, Philadelphia, Pennsylvania* - Overtime

Atlantic 10 men's basketball tournament
Tournament
Atlantic 10 men's basketball tournament
Atlantic 10 men's basketball tournament
Sports in Philadelphia